Marjorie Ellen Mahoney Dusay (née Mahoney; February 20, 1936 – January 28, 2020) was an American actress known for her roles on American soap operas. She was especially known for her role as Alexandra Spaulding on Guiding Light, a role she played on and off from 1993 through the show's 2009 cancellation, as well as Jean MacArthur Faircloth, the wife of Douglas MacArthur, in the 1977 movie MacArthur.

Career
In 1967, Dusay was a member of the Session, an improvisational comedy group in Los Angeles. Her dramatic debut occurred December 21, 1967, in an episode of television's Cimarron Strip. She appeared in the film Sweet November (1968).

Dusay started her career with a small role as a waitress alongside Elvis Presley in the film Clambake in 1967. In 1968, Dusay played a special agent in the TV series Hawaii Five-O, in an episode titled "Twenty-Four Karat Kill". In 1969, Dusay played a woman who agrees to testify against a mobster in "The Singapore File", as well as appearing three times as seductive temptresses on Hogan's Heroes. In 1968-69 she played Gloria in the CBS comedy Blondie.

She made numerous guest appearances on popular television shows in the late 1960s and 1970s. She played alien Kara in "Spock's Brain", the first episode of season three of Star Trek. In it, Dusay delivered arguably one of the most memorable lines of the original Star Trek: "Brain and brain—what is brain?!" She was a popular guest at Star Trek fan conventions, often appearing with personal friend and fellow Star Trek actor Michael Dante. She appeared on Daniel Boone in its 1969 episode "Benvenuto... Who?" as a beautiful French diamond thief named Eugenie.

She starred as Jean MacArthur in the 1977 film MacArthur, and guest-starred as Blair Warner's mother, Monica Warner, on The Facts of Life. In 1982, she appeared as Kate Hanrahan, a madam/con artist, in several episodes of Bret Maverick, in 1982-1983, she portrayed Beverly Tepperman in Square Pegs, and in 1979 she was Jennifer in Stop Susan Williams.

Already an established actress when she began her long career on daytime TV, she made her soap debut in April 1983, replacing Carolyn Jones as the powerful Washington, DC, matriarch Myrna Clegg on Capitol, which she played through the final episode in March 1987. As the rival of the kindly Clarissa McCandless (Constance Towers), she had a part in practically every storyline, as well as a steady leading man in veteran film actor Richard Egan. Dusay received two Supporting Actress Soap Opera Digest nominations for this part.

She then took over for Shirley Anne Field as the troubled Pamela Pepperidge Capwell Conrad on Santa Barbara from 1987–88 and in 1991. As C.C. Capwell's first wife and Mason Capwell's mother, she also became the mother-in-law to Mason's half-sister, Kelly, who married Pamela's other son, Jeffrey Conrad. A brief affair with C.C. ended badly, causing Pamela to go insane and try to kill Kelly. Her 1991 return had Pamela seemingly recovered, but quickly slipping back into insanity when Mason took her to C.C.'s for a surprise dinner. In 1993, she filled in for Louise Sorel as "Vivian Alamain" on Days of Our Lives while Sorel was on medical leave. After a nationwide search for an actress to take over for the enormously popular Beverlee McKinsey, Dusay  began as Alexandra Spaulding on Guiding Light in August 1993, remaining on the show until March 1997. She returned for a brief stint from November 1998-February 1999, but could not resist the chance to create her own part.

Summer 1999, Dusay starred in Andrew Repasky McElhinney's period art-slasher film, A Chronicle of Corpses (released 2001).   The film made a "festival splash" and was praised by Dave Kehr of The New York Times as belonging "to the small but significant tradition of outsider art in American movies - films like Herk Harvey's Carnival of Souls or George Romero's Night of the Living Dead - that reflect powerful personalities formed outside any academic or professional tradition.”  Dusay was praised for her performance as "Grandmother Elliot" in A Chronicle of Corpses which culminates in a tour de force seven-minute monologue for her character.  Dusay received uniformly good notices and several acting awards for her work in A Chronicle of Corpses the including winning the prestigious Silver Unicorn for Best Actor ("Unicornio de plata a la mejor Interpretación" — the highest acting honor) at The 3rd Annual Estepona Fantastic Film Festival  (held in Spain 23–29 September 2002). A Chronicle of Corpses was named one of the Top Ten Movies of the Year by The New York Times and The Village Voice and its original camera negative is in the permanent collection of MoMA - The Museum of Modern Art (New York).  On the occasion of her death, Film International published a fond remembrance of Marj Dusay by A Chronicle of Corpses writer/director McElhinney.

Marj finally originated a soap role as the evil Vanessa Bennett on All My Children from 1999-2002. As the mother of Dr. David Hayward (Vincent Irizarry, her co-star from Guiding Light) and Leo DuPres (Josh Duhamel), she also became Palmer Cortlandt's last wife, giving her another legendary leading man in James Mitchell. After Vanessa's supposed demise after she was revealed to be a drug lord, Marj was persuaded to come back to the Guiding Light, this time replacing Joan Collins, who left three months into a six-month contract. In late May 2005, Dusay was one of several cast members taken off contract due to budget cuts. The show later asked her to remain with the show on recurring status. 

Owing to her popularity in the role, Dusay was given a front-burner storyline in 2006 that had Alexandra marrying a younger man to keep him in the country and scheming to keep him out of a younger woman's bed. While her appearances were greatly reduced after this story ended, she began appearing more upon the return of Grant Aleksander (Philip Spaulding) in 2009. CBS announced that Guiding Light was being cancelled on April 1, 2009, with the last show set to air in September. She appeared in the final episode of Guiding Light, which aired on September 18, 2009. The character of Alexandra had a "happy ending" when old lover Fletcher Reed came to squire her off on a round-the-world cruise to help her deal with the death of her brother.

Personal life
In 1955, she married John Dusay, a physician. They had a son and a daughter, Debra, who is an actress. The marriage ended in divorce in 1962. In 1967, she married Thomas Perine, who died in 1987.

Beginning in 1984, Dusay sponsored the Marj Dusay Celebrity Golf Tournament in Russell, Kansas. The event was designated as a fundraiser for the Kansas Child Abuse Prevention Centers and for establishing a statewide hotline.

On January 28, 2020, Dusay died at the age of 83.

Partial TV and filmography

Clambake (1967) as Waitress
Year 1999 A D. (1967 short) as Karen
The Wild Wild West (1967-1968, TV series) as Dolores Hammond / Crystal Fair
Sweet November (1968) as Carol
Star Trek (1968, episode "Spock's Brain") as Kara
Bonanza (1968-1969, TV Series) as April Horn / Stephanie Regan
Hawaii Five-O (1968-1969, TV series) as Nicole Wylie / Andrea Claire Dupre
Hogan's Heroes (1968-1970, TV series) as Countess Marlene / Baroness von Krimm / Heidi Eberhardt
Pendulum (1969) as Liz Tennant
Dead of Night: A Darkness at Blaisedon (1969, TV movie, Dan Curtis production-TV movie pilot] as Angela Martin
Family Affair (1970, episode "The Unsinkable Mr. French") as Dana Markham
The Odd Couple (1971, episode "What Does a Naked Lady Say To You") as Madelyn
Getting Together (1971, episode "All Shook Up")
Mannix (1971, episode "A Gathering of Ghosts")
McMillan & Wife (1972, episode "The Face of Murder") as Eloise Simms
Thirty Dangerous Seconds (1973) as Patricia Randolph
Breezy (1973) as Betty Tobin
MacArthur (1977) as Jean MacArthur
Wheels (1978, TV miniseries) as Caroline Horton
Stop Susan Williams! (1979, TV series) as Jennifer Selden
The Facts of Life (1981-1987, TV series, recurring) as Monica Warner
Capitol (1983-1987, TV series) as Myrna Clegg
Dallas (1985, TV series) as Bernice Billings
Made in Heaven (1987) as Mrs. Packert
Santa Barbara (1987-1991, TV series) as Pamela Capwell Conrad
Guiding Light (1987-2009, TV series) as Alexandra Spaulding / Radio Show Organist (final appearance)
Murder, She Wrote (1989-1992, TV series) as Miriam Bowman / Alice Reynard Carson
Friday the 13th: The Series (1990, episode "Spirit of Television") as Ilsa Van Zandt
Days of Our Lives (1993, TV series, temporary replacement, replacing Louise Sorel while she was away) as Vivian Alamain
Siao Yu (1995) as Rita
Love Walked In (1997) as Mrs. Moore
12 Bucks (1998) as Oldie
All My Children (1998-2002, TV series) as Vanessa Bennett Hayward Cortlandt
A Chronicle of Corpses (2000) as Grandmother Elliot
Pride & Loyalty (2002) as Aunt Jeanne

Award nominations
Daytime Emmy Awards

 (1995) Daytime Emmy Outstanding Lead Actress in a Drama Series for Guiding Light
 (2002) Special Fan Award America's Favorite Villain for playing Vanessa Cortlandt on All My Children

Soap Opera Digest Awards
 (1986) Soap Opera Digest Award Outstanding Actress in a Supporting Role on a Daytime Serial for Capitol
 (1988) Soap Opera Digest Award Outstanding Actress in a Supporting Role: Daytime for Capitol
 (1995) Soap Opera Digest Award Outstanding Villainess for Guiding Light

References

External links
 
 
 Marj Dusay Facebook Fan Club

1936 births
Actresses from Kansas
American soap opera actresses
American television actresses
2020 deaths
20th-century American actresses
21st-century American actresses
People from Russell, Kansas